Diyan Achjadi is a Vancouver-based printmaker, drawer and animator whose practice explores themes of cross-culture imaginings, influences and contaminations. She was born in Jakarta, Indonesia to a West-Javanese father and English-Canadian mother.

Early life and education 
As a child and teen Achjadi lived in Hong Kong, London, Jakarta and Washington, DC before moving to New York for ten years. Her formative years involved navigating different educational, political and cultural systems, which influenced her art work. She received a BFA from the Cooper Union (New York, NY) and an MFA from Concordia University (Montreal, QC). After teaching at the University of Maryland, she moved to Vancouver in 2005. She has exhibited her work in galleries and film festivals across Canada and beyond.

Career 
Diyan Achjadi is currently an Associate Professor of Print Media at the Emily Carr University of Art + Design in Vancouver, BC.

Art 
Achjadi's work explores cross-cultural narratives through printmaking, drawing and animation. The following are some examples of her work:

Girl 
In this series of animations; web projects; large-scale, ink-jet prints; and multimedia installations, a cartoon girl depicted in bright colours plays in war-torn areas and environmental disaster sites, or parachutes into cities. The works investigate the impacts of militarism and war on children, and consider gender roles and violence in children's media. In Further Adventures with Girl, the character Girl is transposed into scenes of environmental disaster.

Coming Soon 
Coming Soon is a public art project that consists of a series of prints published each month from 2018 to 2019. The prints were installed monthly on buildings and fences around Vancouver, BC. The prints depict construction sites with pylons, construction netting and other construction materials to explore the impact of rapid urban development on residents and visitors to the city.

How Far Do You Travel 
Achjadi's artwork, NonSerie (In Commute), which reconfigures historical Indonesian illustrations, covered a Vancouver TransLink bus as part of a year-long project curated by the Contemporary Art Gallery.

Selected exhibitions 
2006
 See Girl (March, Girl, March!), Access Artist Run Centre, Vancouver, BC.

2009
 Sugar Bombs: Diyan Achjadi and Brendan Tang, Kamloops Art Gallery, Kamloops, BC.

2010
 Construction Site: Identity and Place, Kamloops Art Gallery, Kamloops, BC

2011
 Further Adventures of Girl, Art Gallery of Greater Victoria, Victoria, BC

2015
 Residue: Tracing the Lore: Diyan Achjadi and Brendan Tang, Malaspina Printmakers, Vancouver, BC

2016
 Cultural Conflation: Diyan Achjadi and Shawn Hunt, Richmond Art Gallery, Richmond, BC.
Residue: Tracing the Lore: Diyan Achjadi and Brendan Tang, Open Studio, Toronto, ON.
Pattern Migration, Art Gallery of Mississauga, ON.

2017
 Animate: Diyan Achjadi and Alisi Telengut, Carleton University Art Gallery, Ottawa, ON.
 Façade Festival, Vancouver Art Gallery, Vancouver, BC.

2018
 Memories of the Future III: Diyan Achjadi and Cindy Mochizuki, Roedde House Museum, Vancouver, BC.
 Surface Handling: Diyan Achjadi and Brendan Tang, Dunlop Art Gallery, Regina, SK.

Awards and grants 
 2017 Public Art Commission from the City of Vancouver

References

External links 
Official website

Year of birth missing (living people)
Living people
Concordia University alumni
Cooper Union alumni
Academic staff of the Emily Carr University of Art and Design
Women printmakers
Indonesian animators